In mathematics, specifically algebraic topology, there is a resolution analogous to free resolutions of spectra yielding a tool for constructing the Adams spectral sequence. Essentially, the idea is to take a connective spectrum of finite type  and iteratively resolve with other spectra that are in the homotopy kernel of a map resolving the cohomology classes in  using Eilenberg–MacLane spectra.

This construction can be generalized using a spectrum , such as the Brown–Peterson spectrum , or the complex cobordism spectrum , and is used in the construction of the Adams–Novikov spectral sequencepg 49.

Construction 
The mod  Adams resolution  for a spectrum  is a certain "chain-complex" of spectra induced from recursively looking at the fibers of maps into generalized Eilenberg–Maclane spectra giving generators for the cohomology of resolved spectrapg 43. Then, we can take the homotopy fiber of this map (which acts as a homotopy kernel) to get a space . Then, we can form a commutative diagramwhere the horizontal map is the fiber map. Recursively iterating through this construction yields a commutative diagramgiving the collection .

Resolution of cohomology of a spectrum 
Now, we can use the Adams resolution to construct a free -resolution of the cohomology  of a spectrum .

E*-Adams resolution 
Because there are technical difficulties with studying the cohomology ring  in generalpg 280, we restrict to the case of considering the homology coalgebra  (of co-operations). Note for the case ,  is the dual Steenrod algebra. Since  is an -comodule, we can form the bigraded groupwhich contains the -page of the Adams–Novikov spectral sequence for  satisfying a list of technical conditionspg 50. To get this page, we must construct the -Adams resolutionpg 49, which is somewhat analogous to the cohomological resolution above. We say a diagram of the formwhere the vertical arrows  is an -Adams resolution if

  is the homotopy fiber of 
By retract, we mean there is a map  such that 
  is a retract of 
  if , otherwise it is 

Although this seems like a long laundry list of properties, they are very important in the construction of the spectral sequence. In addition, the retract properties affect the structure of construction of the -Adams resolution since we no longer need to take a wedge sum of spectra for every generator.

Construction for ring spectra 
The construction of the -Adams resolution is rather simple to state in comparison to the previous resolution for any associative, commutative, connective ring spectrum  satisfying some additional hypotheses.

In additionwhich gives the desired  terms from the flatness.

Relation to cobar complex 
It turns out the -term of the associated Adams–Novikov spectral sequence is then cobar complex .

See also 

 Adams spectral sequence
 Adams–Novikov spectral sequence
 Eilenberg–Maclane spectrum
 Hopf algebroid

References 

Algebraic topology
Homological algebra
Topology